Mogudu Pellam O Dongodu  is a 2005 Telugu (English : Husband, wife and a thief) film directed by Venky. The film has only 3 characters, which makes it different from the other films of its time.

Plot
Sri Rama Chandra Murthy (Raja) weds Satyabhama (Shriya Saran) after falling in love. Murthy is an NRI and Satyabhama is a well-educated village girl. During their first night, Satyabhama enters the room at 10 P.M. and tells him that their grandmother advised that they cannot meet until midnight as the muhurtham is at 12 A.M. Both of them will be eagerly waiting for the clock to tick 12. A first-time thief (Brahmanandam) enters the room at 11 P.M. when there was a power cut without the knowledge of the couple. Satyabhama locks the door and keeps the key with her so that no thief can enter inside without knowing the fact that the thief was already in their bedroom. While trying to steal things in the bedroom, the thief tries to escape out of the room by snatching the key from Satyabhama. While spending time talking to each other, Murthy gets angry when he got to know at 11.30 P.M. that Satyabhama lied about muhurtham just because she wanted to spend some time talking. Then, comes the climax where the thief comes out and solves their fight. The thief escapes and the story ends with the couple becoming one.

Cast
Raja as Sri Rama Chandra Murthy (Husband)
Shriya Saran as Satyabhama M.A. M.Phil (Wife)
Brahmanandam as Thief

Soundtrack 
Lyrics ... Chandrabose and Peddada Murthy

References

External links
Review at Idlebrain
Photo Gallery

2000s Telugu-language films
2005 films